The Mango Research Station is a Bangladesh government owned research centre specializing in the research of mango production and development. The centre has developed 12 hybrid species of mango in Bangladesh.

History
The Mango Research Station was established in 1985. It is administered by the Horticulture Division of Bangladesh Agricultural Research Institute. It is located on a 30-acre campus in Chapainawabganj District. It is led by a chief scientific officer.

In September 2020, the centre announced the development of Bari Mango-13, a new variety of hybrid mango developed using mangoes from Bangladesh and Florida. Jamir Uddin, Chief Scientific Officer of the centre stated that research was started in 2005.

References

1985 establishments in Bangladesh
Organisations based in Bangladesh
Agriculture research institutes in Bangladesh